Eucalyptus verrucata, commonly known as Mount Abrupt stringybark, is a species of shrub or a small tree that is endemic to the  Grampians in Victoria, Australia. It has smooth bark, rough bark on the base of older trees, egg-shaped to elliptical adult leaves, flower buds usually singly in groups of three in leaf axils, white flowers and cup-shaped or hemispherical fruit.

Description
It has smooth greyish to brownish bark, sometimes hard, fibrous bark on the base of the trunk of older plants. Flowering has been observed in July and September and the flowers are white.

Taxonomy and naming
The specific epithet (verrucata) is from the Latin word verrucatus meaning "warty", referring to the flower buds.

Distribution and habitat
The Mount Abrupt stringybark grows in rocky places on the southern end of the Serra Range in the Grampians National Park.

See also
List of Eucalyptus species

References

Flora of Victoria (Australia)
Trees of Australia
verrucata
Myrtales of Australia
Plants described in 1995